Anapel is the goddess of reincarnation and birth worshipped by the Koryak people of Siberia. Her name means "Little Grandmother" in the Koryak language. She was worshipped at ceremonies following the birth of a new child.

Sources
GodFinder.org
Eastern European goddesses (Archived 2009-10-25)

Siberian deities